The Tarboo Unit is a North Olympic Wildlife Area, managed by the Washington Department of Fish and Wildlife, that lies 4.5 miles northeast of Quilcene, Washington at the top of Tarboo Bay. It is located on the coast of Jefferson County on the Olympic Peninsula in northwest Washington state. The conservation natural area is home to both deciduous and conifer forests and supports protected species such as bald eagle, northern spotted owl, and marbled murrelet.

Species
Birds
Birds of prey
Eagles
Marine birds
Shorebirds
Songbirds
Upland birds
Wading birds
Waterfowl
Mammals
Bear
Deer
Small mammals
Other
Reptiles
Amphibians

See also
Hood Canal
Quilcene, Washington
Big Quilcene Estuary
Big Quilcene River
Little Quilcene Estuary
Little Quilcene River
Donovan Creek Estuary
Olympic Peninsula

References

External links
North Olympic Wildlife Area: Tarboo Unit Washington Department of Fish and Wildlife

Protected areas of Jefferson County, Washington
Protected areas of Washington (state)